St. Luke's Church (Bull Hill Church; St. Luke's Methodist Church) is a historic church in rural Beaufort County, South Carolina located about four miles north of Pritchardville.

The original Episcopal congregation worshipped about a half mile away in a 1786 building built on land donated by John Bull. In 1824 the present building was constructed on land contributed by John Guerard, on part of what had been Bull Hill Plantation. In 1857, the Church of the Cross was built in nearby Bluffton, and services were discontinued around that time. In 1875, the church was sold to the Methodists, who use it to the present day.

The church is noted for its transitional architecture bridging the Georgian style of earlier South Carolina Episcopal churches and the rising Greek Revival style. It is one of the oldest churches in the state built for Episcopal worship, and one of the few with intact slave galleries.

It was added to the National Register of Historic Places in 1987.

References

Methodist churches in South Carolina
Churches on the National Register of Historic Places in South Carolina
Georgian architecture in South Carolina
Churches completed in 1824
19th-century Episcopal church buildings
Churches in Beaufort County, South Carolina
National Register of Historic Places in Beaufort County, South Carolina